These are the late night schedules on all three networks for each calendar season beginning September 1982. All times are Eastern/Pacific.

PBS is not included, as member television stations have local flexibility over most of their schedules and broadcast times for network shows may vary, CBS and ABC are not included on the weekend schedules (as the networks do not offer late night programs of any kind on weekends).

Talk/variety shows are highlighted in yellow, network news programs in gold, and local news & programs are highlighted in white background.

Monday-Friday

Saturday

Sunday

By network

ABC

Returning Series
Nightline

New Series
One on One
The Last Word

Not Returning From 1981-82
ABC Late Night
Fridays

CBS

Returning Series
The CBS Late Movie

New Series
CBS News Nightwatch

NBC

Returning Series
Late Night with David Letterman
NBC Late Night Movie
NBC News Overnight
Saturday Night Live
SCTV Network 90
The Tonight Show Starring Johnny Carson

New Series
Friday Night Videos

Not Returning From 1981-82
Tomorrow Coast to Coast

United States late night network television schedules
1982 in American television
1983 in American television